Seiichi Suzuki may refer to:

, Japanese figure skater
 Seiichi Suzuki (philologist) (born 1956), Japanese philologist
 Seiichi Suzuki (composer) (1901–1980), Japanese mandolinist and film score composer
 Seiichi Suzuki (racing driver) (?–1974), Japanese racing driver killed in a crash at the 1974 Fuji Grand Champion Series